Roller skating and inline hockey were contested at the 1999 Pan American Games, held in Winnipeg, Manitoba, Canada.

Roller skating

Men's events
Speed

Artistic

Women's events
Speed

Artistic

Mixed events
Artistic

Inline hockey

Men

Medal table

References

Events at the 1999 Pan American Games
1999
1999 in roller sports